James Michael LeClair (born March 23, 1944) is a former American football quarterback in the American Football League. He played for the Denver Broncos. He played college football for C.W. Post.

References

1944 births
Living people
American football quarterbacks
Denver Broncos (AFL) players
LIU Post Pioneers football players